Solone is an urban-type settlement in Dnipro Raion of Dnipropetrovsk Oblast in Ukraine. It hosts the administration of Solone settlement hromada, one of the hromadas of Ukraine. Population:

History 
Solone is located on both banks of the Solonenka River, a right tributary of the Mokra Sura River, itself a right tributary of the Dnieper.

In 1803 the Sts. Peter and Paul Church was built in Solonenke as the village was then called.

In 1889 Tsar Alexander III promulgated the Land Captain (Zemstvo chief) Statute of 1889, abolishing the old position of justice of the peace.  As a result, Yekaterinoslav Governorate was divided into 7 precincts.  The 3rd precinct included  the following areas: Surske, Lotsman-Kamyansk, Voloske, Solone, Mykilske, and Yamburg.

In 1937, the Soviet government had built a grandiose theater in Solone, which was destroyed during the retreat of the German army in 1943.

In August 1941, the NKVD  created a Solone  partisan detachment (commander Volobuev) which existed until November 1941.

Until 18 July 2020, Solone was the administrative center of Solone Raion. The raion was abolished in July 2020 as part of the administrative reform of Ukraine, which reduced the number of raions of Dnipropetrovsk Oblast to seven. The area of Solone Raion was merged into Dnipro Raion.

Economy

Transportation
Solone has access to the Highway M04 connecting Dnipro with Kryvyi Rih, as well as to the Highway H08 connecting Dnipro with Zaporizhzhia.

The closest railway station is in the village of Nadiivka, on the railway connecting Dnipro and Apostolove.

References

External links 
 NKVD Units in the German-Soviet war 1941-1945.  Volobuev's Unit. How it looked from the inside
 Are Land Captains a boring topic? Is not a fact. Part 1 Solone district..
 The history of the unique Solone theater (1937-1943) under two regimes.
 The Orthodox life . P. 1 The  village Solone

Urban-type settlements in Dnipro Raion